The following is a list of events affecting Philippine television in 2005. Events listed include television show debuts, finales, cancellations, and channel launches, closures and rebrandings, as well as information about controversies and carriage disputes.

Events
 April 25 - GMA Network's subsidiary Citynet Network Marketing and Productions and ZOE Broadcasting Network entered a blocktime deal to air some GMA-produced programs on Channel 11 (ZOE's owned TV frequency).
 July 21: GEM TV (now INCTV) was established on UHF Channel 49 (Digital).
 September 26: Miss International 2005 is won by Lara Quigaman.
 November 11: QTV (now GTV) was launched by GMA Network, after the network entered an airtime agreement with ZOE Broadcasting Network to use DZOE-TV channel 11 for its said channel.
 December 10: The first season of Pinoy Big Brother is won by Nene Tamayo.
 December 15: ETC 2nd Avenue was launched by Solar Entertainment Corporation on cable TV.

Premieres

Unknown dates
 January:
 On-Air Tambayan on IBC 13
 SINGLE on IBC 13

Unknown
PBB: What's The Word That's The Word on ABS-CBN 2
Close Up to Fame, The Search for the Next Close Up Couple on ABS-CBN 2
Payong Kapatid on ABS-CBN 2
Perfect Moments on ABS-CBN 2
A.R.K. (Anime Ring Kaisho) on ABC 5
Ating Alamin on ABC 5
Comedy Bites on ABC 5
EZ Shop on ABC 5
Mom TV on ABC 5
Ang Pagbubunyag on Net 25
The Insider on ETC
Project Runway on ETC
Buhay Pinoy on SBN 21
Mag-Negosyo Tayo! on RPN 9
Superbrands on RPN 9
Isumbong Mo! (Tulfo Brothers) on RPN 9
Kapatid on RPN 9
Makabayang Doktor on RPN 9
Signs and Wonders on RPN 9
What Would Jesus Do? on RPN 9
Winner TV Shopping on NBN 4
Dagundong on NBN 4
Tinig ng Bayan on NBN 4
Amerika Atbp. on IBC 13
Buhay Pinoy on IBC 13
Krusada Kontra Krimen on NBN 4/RPN 9/IBC 13
Pilipinas Sabong Sports on IBC 13
SMS: Sunday Mall Show on IBC 13
Tinig ng Kanyang Pagbabalik on IBC 13
TV Patrol Southern Mindanao on ABS-CBN TV-4 Davao
Believer TV on UNTV 37
Ex - Files on UNTV 37
Kapitbahay at Kapitbisig on UNTV 37
Kaka In Action on UNTV 37
Mapalad Ang Bumabasa on UNTV 37
New Generation on UNTV 37
Public Hearing on UNTV 37
Start Your Day The Christian Way on UNTV 37
Startist on UNTV 37
Thanksgiving Day on UNTV 37
Usapang Kristyano on UNTV 37

Returning or renamed programs

Programs transferring networks

Finales
 January 7: Forever in My Heart (GMA 7)
 January 21:
 Promise (ABS-CBN 2)
 January 28:
 Lovers in Paris (ABS-CBN 2)
 Morning Star (ABS-CBN 2)
 Gata Salvaje (ABS-CBN 2)
 Feel 100% (ABS-CBN 2)
 Star Circle Quest (season 2) (ABS-CBN 2)
 White Book of Love (GMA 7)
 January 29: EK Channel (ABS-CBN 2)
 January 30: Ang Tanging Ina (ABS-CBN 2)
 February 4:
 MTB: Ang Saya Saya (ABS-CBN 2)
 It's Chowtime (IBC 13)
 February 8: Bida si Mister, Bida si Misis (ABS-CBN 2)
 February 12:
 SBD Jam (ABS-CBN TV-4 Davao)
 Tsada (ABS-CBN TV-2 Cagayan de Oro)
 Zambo Jambo (ABS-CBN TV-3 Zamboanga)
 February 20: StarStruck (season 2) (GMA 7)
 February 27: Wansapanataym (ABS-CBN 2)
 March 4: Daisy Siete: May Bukas Pa ang Kahapon (GMA 7)
 March 11: Joyride (GMA 7)
 March 18: Mulawin (GMA 7)
 March 30: Jessica Soho Reports (GMA 7)
 April 8:
 Save the Last Dance for Me (ABS-CBN 2)
 Stairway to Heaven (GMA 7)
 April 15: Irene (GMA 7)
 April 16: The Probe Team Documentaries (ABC 5)
 April 22: Krystala (ABS-CBN 2)
 April 29: Full House (GMA 7)
 April 30:
 Sing Galing! (ABC 5)
 Wow Mali (ABC 5)
 May 1: Naks! (GMA 7)
 May 6: Spirits (ABS-CBN 2)
 May 13: 'Til Death Do Us Part (ABS-CBN 2)
 May 20: 
 Kamao: Matirang Matibay (ABS-CBN 2)
 Hiram (ABS-CBN 2)
 May 21: StarDance (ABS-CBN 2)
 May 26: American Idol (season 4) (ABC 5)
 June 3:
 Magandang Umaga, Bayan (ABS-CBN 2)
 Stained Glass (ABS-CBN 2)
 June 10:
 Now and Forever: Mukha (GMA 7)
 Glass Shoes (GMA 7)
 Sweet 18 (GMA 7)
 June 12: SCQ Reload (ABS-CBN 2)
 June 17:
 Memories of Bali (ABS-CBN 2)
 All About Eve (GMA 7)
 June 29: Dong Puno Live (ABS-CBN 2)
 July 1: Showbiz Number 1 (ABS-CBN 2)
 July 15:
 M.R.S. (Most Requested Show) (ABS-CBN 2)
 Daisy Siete: Tahanan (GMA 7)
 July 29: Señorita Mei (GMA 7)
 August 12:
 Saang Sulok ng Langit (GMA 7)
 Oh Feel Young (ABS-CBN 2)
 Friends (GMA 7)
 August 30: Adyenda (ZOE TV 11)
 August 31:
 ZOE Balita Ngayon (ZOE TV 11)
 ZOE News Round-up (ZOE TV 11)
 September 3: Idol Ko si Kap (GMA 7)
 September 4: ABS-CBN News Advisory (ABS-CBN 2)
 September 9: Attic Cat (GMA 7)
 September 16: Green Rose (ABS-CBN 2)
 September 17: Hoy Gising! Kapamilya (ABS-CBN 2)
 September 25: Qpids (ABS-CBN 2)
 September 30: Hotelier (GMA 7)
 October 6: All For Love (GMA 7) 
 October 21: Now and Forever: Ganti (GMA 7)
 November 4:
 Ikaw ang Lahat sa Akin (ABS-CBN 2)
 Sassy Girl: Chun-Hyang (GMA 7)
 November 5: Club TV (ABC 5)
 November 8: Chowtime Na! (IBC 13)
 November 10: Romance (GMA 7)
 November 20: Hollywood Dream (ABC 5)
 November 25:
 TV Patrol Naga (ABS-CBN TV-11 Naga)
 TV Patrol Legaspi (ABS-CBN TV-4 Legazpi)
 Darna (GMA 7)
 December 2: My 19 Year Old Sister-in-Law (GMA 7)
 December 3: Makuha Ka sa Tikim (ABS-CBN 2)
 December 9: Encantadia (GMA 7)
 December 16:
 Kampanerang Kuba (ABS-CBN 2)
 Rubí (ABS-CBN 2)
 December 23: Date With Tiffany (GMA 7)
 December 30: 18 VS. 29 (GMA 7)
 December 31: 
 Magandang Gabi... Bayan (ABS-CBN 2)

Unknown dates
July:
 On-Air Tambayan (IBC 13)
 SINGLE (IBC 13)
October: The Misadventures of Maverick and Ariel (ABC 5)

Unknown
 Sandara's Romance (ABS-CBN 2)
 Home Along da Airport (ABS-CBN 2)
 VidJoking (ABS-CBN 2)
 Kaya Mo Ba 'To? (ABS-CBN 2)
 Private I (ABS-CBN 2)
 Perfect Moments (ABS-CBN 2)
 Kumikitang Kabuhayan (ABS-CBN 2)
 Art Jam (ABS-CBN 2)
 Seasons of Love (ABS-CBN 2)
 Ating Alamin (IBC 13)
 The Gospel of the Kingdom with Pastor Apollo C. Quiboloy (IBC 13)
 Bubble Gang Jr. (GMA 7)
 SMC's Dayriser (GMA 7)
 Shaider (GMA 7)
 The 700 Club Asia (ZOE TV 11)
 New Life TV Shopping (ZOE TV 11)
 Psalty The Bible Show (ZOE TV 11)
 Quigley's Village (ZOE TV 11)
 Superbook (ZOE TV 11)
 The Flying House (ZOE TV 11)
 Flying Rhino Junior High (ABC 5)
 Art Is Kool (ABC 5)
 Between the Lions (Net 25)
 Play Music Videos (Net 25)
 Urban Peasant (Net 25)
 Con Todos Recados (Net 25)
 Captured (Net 25)
 Tokshow With Mr. Shooli (RPN 9)
 Beauty School Plus (RPN 9)
 Direct Line (RPN 9)
 Diyos at Bayan (RPN 9)
 RPN Forum (RPN 9)
 Ratsada Balita (RPN 9)
 Prangkahan (RPN 9)
 Ugnayang Pambansa (RPN 9)
 Cathedral of Praise with David Sumrall (RPN 9)
 Life In The Word (RPN 9)
 Pan sa Kinabuhi (RPN 9)
 45 Minutos (NBN 4)
 Headlines Expose (NBN 4)
 Saklolo Abugado (NBN 4)
 TeleAga (NBN 4)
 DMZ TV (IBC 13)
 Global Family Series (IBC 13)
 Entrepinoy Start-Up (IBC 13)
 Good Take (IBC 13)
 Girls Marching On (ABS-CBN 2)
 TV Patrol Mindanao (ABS-CBN TV-4 Davao)
 Ads Unlimited (UNTV 37)
 Ano sa Palagay Mo? (UNTV 37)
 Breakthrough (UNTV 37)
 FAQ's (UNTV 37)
 Ito Ang Balita (UNTV 37)
 Kapitbahay at Kapitbisig (UNTV 37)
 Kids at Work (UNTV 37)
 Kulay Pinoy (UNTV 37)
 Mr. Fix It (UNTV 37)
 Pangarap ng Puso (UNTV 37)
 Startist (UNTV 37)
 Teleskuwela (UNTV 37)
 Weird Doctrines (UNTV 37)
 Workshop on TV (UNTV 37)

Networks

Launches
 January 1:
 HBO Family
 HBO Signature
 July 12: Jack TV
 July 21: GEM TV (now INCTV)
 September 1: Boomerang Philippines
 October 1: Hero
 October 15: Crime/Suspense
 November 11: QTV (now GTV)
 December 12: Playhouse Disney (Asia)
 December 15: ETC 2nd Avenue

Unknown dates
 November: Shop TV

Unknown
 RPN USA

Closures
 September 1: ZOE TV 11

Births
February 16 - AJ Urquia, actor and host of Team Yey!
February 23 - Jillian Ward, actress, model and singer
March 19 - Dentrix Ponce, actor
March 25 - Larah Claire Sabroso, actress
June 12 - Ryzza Mae Dizon, actress
September 7 - Mitch Naco, actress and host of Team Yey!
September 7 - Kyle Ocampo, actress and model
November 8 - Sofia Millares, actress and host of Team Yey!
November 11 - Kryshee Grengia, actress
November 16 - Bea Basa, actress

Deaths
January 7 - Orly Punzalan, Filipino radio-TV personality (born 1935)
May 10 - Romy Diaz, Filipino actor (born 1941)
May 28 - Richard Tann, Filipino Singer, Member of Circus Band, heart attack (born 1954)
June 8 - Luis Santiago, TV director, gunshot (born 1977)
September 16 - Verna Gaston - Filipino actress (born 1950)
October 2 - Juancho Gutierrez - Filipino Actor (born 1932)
November 18 - Freddie Quizon, Filipino actor, comedian, production coordinator (born 1956)

See also
2005 in television

References

 
Television in the Philippines by year
Philippine television-related lists